Harpreet Singh Sandhu is a Sikh American politician and community activist from Richmond, California and one of the most prominent ones of the Sikh religion. He was the first Asian and the first Sikh city councilman in Richmond, and one of only a few Sikhs to hold office in the United States.

Political career 
He was appointed to the council in January, 2007, to fill a vacancy left by Gayle McLaughlin when she became mayor from the city's Human Rights Commission. He received five votes with three abstentions. He began his single term with his swearing in on January 16, 2007. Sandhu was one of a very few Sikh officeholders in the United States and the only one in California during his term.

In 2008 he ran unsuccessfully for a full term. He was endorsed by Jerry Brown and ran on an anti-crime, pro-municipal services platform. He came in seventh in a contest for three available seats. Sandhu had voted along with the "Viramontes five" in July 2008 to expand the operational capacity of the Chevron Richmond Refinery, which was opposed by the more liberal bloc that took a majority of the council in the 2008 election.

Harpreet Singh Sandhu was elected to represent Congressional District 7 as a Barack Obama delegate to the 2008 Democratic National Convention in Denver. He was also invited to the White House's first-ever celebration of Guru Nanak as a prominent member of the Sikh community.

He is a former president of the Sikh Center of San Francisco Bay Area, one of the largest Sikh places of worship in America. He served on the human relations and human rights commission. Sandhu is a longtime advocate for the safety of taxi drivers who have often been the victims of crime, both for opportunity and alleged hate.

Harpreet S. Sandhu had a major role in forming the American Sikh Congressional Caucus, which is a bipartisan group of lawmakers to address Sikh American issues.

2008 election results

Personal life 
Harpreet Singh Sandhu is an immigrant from India. He is married to Interpreet Sandhu; they have three children. He attended San Francisco State University. He worked as a postal worker for more than 20 years.

References

External links 
 

Activists from the San Francisco Bay Area
American Sikhs
American businesspeople
Living people
Richmond City Council members (California)
Year of birth missing (living people)
Indian emigrants to the United States
American politicians of Indian descent
California politicians of Indian descent
San Francisco State University alumni